Murcheh Khvort Rural District is a rural district (dehestan) in the Central District of Shahin Shahr and Meymeh County, Isfahan Province, Iran. At the 2006 census, its population was 2,876, in 949 families.  It has 25 villages.

References 

Rural Districts of Isfahan Province
Shahin Shahr and Meymeh County